is the ninth studio album by Japanese boy band Arashi. The album was released on August 4, 2010 in Japan under their record label J Storm in two editions: a first press version and a regular version. The album debuted at number-one on the Oricon weekly album chart, selling around 731,000 copies. As of August 2010, Boku no Miteiru Fūkei is the best-selling album of 2010 in Japan. On October 12, 2010, the album became the first album of the year to sell over a million copies in Japan. According to Oricon, Boku no Miteiru Fūkei is the best-selling album of 2010 in Japan. The album was released digitally on February 7, 2020.

Album information
Both the first press and regular versions contain twenty tracks; however, the first press edition comes with a special booklet while the regular edition comes with only a lyrics booklet.

Songs
Boku no Miteiru Fūkei contains four of the band's previously released singles: "Everything", "My Girl", "Troublemaker" and "Monster". "Everything" was used as the theme song for the au by KDDI commercials featuring Arashi as the endorsers, and "My Girl" was used as the theme song for the drama with the same title starring member Masaki Aiba. According to Oricon, "Everything" and "My Girl" were also the fifth and third best-selling 2009 singles respectively in Japan. "Troublemaker" was used as the theme song for the drama  starring Arashi member Sho Sakurai and Maki Horikita, and "Monster" was used as the theme song for the drama  starring Arashi member Satoshi Ohno.

"Movin' On", the first track of the first disc, was used as the theme song for a Japan Airlines commercial.

"Sora Takaku", sixth track of the second disc, was used as the theme song for Arashi's drama special Saigo no Yakusoku. On January 7, 2010, two days before the drama special's release date, Mezamashi TV aired the first preview of "Sora Takaku".

Promotion
It was announced on September 4, 2010 that Japan Airlines (JAL) will use a Boeing 777-200 bearing both the images of the members of Arashi and the title of the album, which will be sold with a specially designed cover in-flight, from September 5, 2010 to January 2011.

Commercial performance
On the first day of its release, the album debuted at number-one on the Oricon daily album chart by selling around 275,000 copies. The album maintained its number-one spot on the Oricon album chart, selling around 731,000 copies in its first week. The album remained number-one in its second week, making Boku no Miteiru Fūkei Arashi's first studio album to lead the Oricon weekly album chart for two consecutive weeks. By selling around another 125,000 copies, the album has sold a total of 856,000 copies. As of October 2010, the album has sold 1,007,896 copies, making it the first album of the year to reach one million copies sold in Japan.

Boku no Miteiru Fūkei has been certified Million by Recording Industry Association of Japan (RIAJ).

Track listing

Charts and certifications

Charts

Sales and certifications

Release history

Personnel

Musicians

Arashi
Masaki Aiba – vocals
Jun Matsumoto – vocals
Kazunari Ninomiya – vocals
Satoshi Ohno – vocals
Sho Sakurai – vocals
Pia-no-Jac – Piano, cajón

Footnotes

References

External links

 at Oricon

Arashi albums
2010 albums
J Storm albums